Fui Sha Wai is a walled village in Ping Shan, Yuen Long District, Hong Kong.

Administration
Fui Sha Wai is a recognized village under the New Territories Small House Policy. It is one of the 37 villages represented within the Ping Shan Rural Committee.

History
Fui Sha Wai is one of the three wais (walled villages) and six tsuens (villages) established by the Tang Clan of Ping Shan, namely: Sheung Cheung Wai, Kiu Tau Wai, Fui Sha Wai, Hang Tau Tsuen, Hang Mei Tsuen, Tong Fong Tsuen, San Tsuen, Hung Uk Tsuen and San Hei Tsuen.

At the time of the 1911 census, the population of Fui Sha Wai was 165. The number of males was 72.

See also
 Walled villages of Hong Kong
 Ping Shan Heritage Trail

References

External links

 Delineation of area of existing village Fui Sha Wai (Ping Shan) for election of resident representative (2019 to 2022)
 Antiquities and Monuments Office. Hong Kong Traditional Chinese Architectural Information System. Fui Sha Wai

Walled villages of Hong Kong
Ping Shan
Villages in Yuen Long District, Hong Kong